The Journal of the American Association of Nurse Practitioners is a monthly peer-reviewed nursing journal covering the practice of nurse practitioners. It is the official journal of the American Association of Nurse Practitioners. The journal was established in 1989 as the Journal of the American Academy of Nurse Practitioners, obtaining its current name in 2013.

Abstracting and indexing
The journal is abstracted and indexed by:

According to the Journal Citation Reports, the journal has a 2017 impact factor of 1.136, ranking it 64th out of 115 journals in the category "Nursing", and 81st out of 94 journals in the category "Health Care Sciences & Services".

References

External links

English-language journals
Wiley-Blackwell academic journals
Publications established in 1989
Monthly journals
General nursing journals